Stonehenge, Queensland may refer to:
 Stonehenge, Queensland (Barcoo Shire)
 Stonehenge, Queensland (Toowoomba Region)